Mark Burrows is an Australian television news presenter and journalist.

He is currently a senior correspondent for Nine News in Sydney. Burrows is also a news presenter for Today Extra, Nine's morning and afternoon news on Monday's and is a stand-in presenter for Nine News Sydney at 6 pm. Burrows has been a journalist for the Nine Network for more than three decades.

Career 
Burrows spent almost six years working as Nine's US correspondent, covering two US presidential elections, the LA riots and earthquakes. In 1996 he was Nine’s reporter for the Atlanta Olympics.

In 1997 Burrows was posted to Nine's London Bureau where he covered the death of Princess Diana and the Iraq war. He also made numerous trips to Majorca in Spain covering fugitive Christopher Skase.

In 2000, Burrows was a part of Nine's Sydney Olympics reporting team.

Burrows led the coverage of the Bali bombings at the end of 2002. The coverage earned Nine a Walkley and Logie Award. He went on report on the Bali Nine drug arrests and the jailing of marijuana smuggler Schapelle Corby.

He is now a senior reporter for Nine News in Sydney.

Burrows has been a journalist for Nine News for more than 35 years.

Personal life

Early life 
Burrows was born and bred in Hobart, Tasmania, Australia. After three years at the University of Tasmania, he turned his back on a career in the law and joined Hobart’s TVT6, where he covered the Franklin River dam controversy under the mentorship of journalist Hendrik Gout.

Family 
Burrows is married and has two sons.

Awards 
Burrows has won many awards while working for decades as a journalist.

References 

Nine News presenters
Living people
Australian television journalists
Year of birth missing (living people)